Stemmatophora gadesialis is a species of snout moth in the genus Stemmatophora. It was described by Émile Louis Ragonot in 1882 and is known from Spain and Algeria.

The wingspan is about 18 mm.

References

Moths described in 1882
Pyralini
Moths of Europe
Moths of Africa